The Gap, Inc., commonly known as Gap Inc. or Gap (stylized as GAP), is an American worldwide clothing and accessories retailer. Gap was founded in 1969 by Donald Fisher and Doris F. Fisher and is headquartered in San Francisco, California. The company operates four primary divisions: Gap (the namesake banner), Banana Republic, Old Navy, and Athleta. Gap Inc. is the largest specialty retailer in the United States, and is 3rd in total international locations, behind Inditex Group and H&M. As of September 2008, the company has approximately 135,000 employees and operates 3,727 stores worldwide, of which 2,406 are located in the U.S.

The Fisher family remains deeply involved in the company, collectively owning much of its stock. Donald Fisher served as chairman of the board until 2004, playing a role in the ouster of then-CEO Millard Drexler in 2002, and remained on the board until his death on September 27, 2009. Fisher's wife and their son, Robert J. Fisher, also serve on Gap's board of directors. Robert succeeded his father as chairman in 2004 and also served as CEO on an interim basis following the resignation of Paul Pressler in 2007, before being succeeded by Glenn K. Murphy up until 2014. From February  2015 to November 2019, Art Peck was CEO of Gap Inc., until he was replaced by Sonia Syngal in March 2020. Syngal stepped down in July 2022, with Executive Chairman Bob Martin serving as interim CEO.

History
In 1969, Don Fisher, a California commercial real estate broker specializing in retail store location, enlisted the help of his friend, Walter Haas Jr., President of Levi Strauss & Co.. Fisher was inspired by the sudden success of 'The Tower of Shoes' in an old Quonset Hut in a non-retail industrial area of Sacramento, California, that drew crowds by advertising that no matter what brand, style or size of shoes a woman could want it was at The Tower of Shoes. And knowing that even Macy's, the biggest Levi's customer, was constantly running out of the best selling Levi's sizes, and colors, Fisher asked Haas to let him copy The Tower of Shoes' business model and apply it to Levi's products. Haas referred Fisher to Bud Robinson, his Director of Advertising, for what Haas assumed would be a quick refusal; but instead Robinson and Fisher carefully worked out a legal test plan for what was to become The Gap (named by Don's wife Doris Fisher). The name was a reference to the "generation gap".

Fisher agreed to stock only Levi's apparel in every style and size, all grouped by size, and Levi's guaranteed The Gap to be never out of stock by overnight replenishment from Levi's San Jose, California warehouse. And finally, Robinson offered to pay 50% of The Gap's radio advertising upfront and avoided antitrust laws by offering the same marketing package to any store that agreed to sell nothing but Levi's products.

Fisher opened the first Gap store near City College on Ocean Avenue in Ingleside, San Francisco on August 21, 1969; its only merchandise consisted of Levi's and LP records to attract teen customers.

In 1970, Gap opened its second store in San Jose. In 1971, Gap established its corporate headquarters in Burlingame, California with four employees. By 1973, the company had over 25 locations and had expanded into the East Coast market with a store in the Echelon Mall in Voorhees, New Jersey. In 1974, Gap began to sell private label merchandise.

In the 1990s, Gap assumed an upscale identity and revamped its inventory under the direction of Mickey Drexler. However, Drexler was removed from his position after 19 years of service in 2002 after over-expansion, a 29-month slump in sales, and tensions with the Fisher family. Drexler refused to sign a non-compete agreement and eventually became CEO of J. Crew. One month after his departure, merchandise that he had ordered was responsible for a strong rebound in sales. Robert J. Fisher recruited Paul Pressler as the new CEO; he was credited with closing under-performing locations and paying off debt. However, his focus groups failed to recover the company's leadership in its market.

In 2007, Gap announced that it would "focus [its] efforts on recruiting a chief executive officer who has deep retailing and merchandising experience ideally in apparel, understands the creative process and can effectively execute strategies in large, complex environments while maintaining strong financial discipline". That January, Pressler resigned after two disappointing holiday sales seasons and was succeeded by Robert J. Fisher on an interim basis. He began working with the company in 1980 and joined the board in 1990, and would later assume several senior executive positions, including president of Banana Republic and the Gap units. The board's search committee was led by Adrian Bellamy, chairman of The Body Shop International and included founder Donald Fisher. On February 2, Marka Hansen, the former head of the Banana Republic division, replaced Cynthia Harriss as the leader of the Gap division. The executive president for marketing and merchandising Jack Calhoun became interim president of Banana Republic. In May, Old Navy laid off approximately 300 managers in lower volume locations to help streamline costs. That July, Glenn Murphy, previously CEO of Shoppers Drug Mart in Canada, was announced as the new CEO of Gap, Inc. New lead designers were also brought on board to help define a fashionable image, including Patrick Robinson for Gap Adult, Simon Kneen for Banana Republic, and Todd Oldham for Old Navy. Robinson was hired as chief designer in 2007, but was dismissed in May 2011 after sales failed to increase. However, he enjoyed commercial success in international markets. In 2007, Ethisphere Magazine chose Gap from among thousands of companies evaluated as one of 100 "World's Most Ethical Companies".

In October 2011, Gap Inc. announced plans to close 189 US stores, nearly 21 percent, by the end of 2013; however, it also plans to expand its presence in China. The company announced it would open its first stores in Brazil in the Fall of 2013.

In January 2015, Gap Inc. announced plans to close their subsidiary Piperlime in order to focus on their core brands. The first and only Piperlime store, based in SoHo, New York City, closed in April.

In September 2018, Gap Inc. began publicizing Hill City, a men's athletic apparel brand that launched in October 2018.

In June 2020, Gap Inc. announced its collaboration with Kanye West's Yeezy Brand: Yeezy Gap. The announcement of the company's 10-year long contract with the music icon turned fashion innovator saw Gap Inc. garner $34.9 million in media impact value.

In August 2020, the company announced that it, alongside its Banana Republic brand, would close over 225 store locations as a result of the COVID-19 pandemic response. Less than two months later, the company announced that the total number of stores to be closed by 2024 was 350. (220 Gap stores and 130 Banana Republic stores.) The original plan of the company was to close only 90 stores, however, they expanded the number as a consequence of the financial effects caused by the pandemic restrictions. Most of the stores closed were ones set in malls.

In November 2020, Gap Inc. partnered with Afterpay. This collaboration was planned to improve the digital shopping experience.

In February 2021, Gap Inc. announced a $140 million investment to build an 850,000 square foot distribution center in Longview, Texas, because it forecasts that its online business will double over the next two years. The new center will be able to process one million packages per day once completed in 2022.

In September 2021, Gap Inc. cut the ribbon for the $41.7 million facility expansion in Gallatin, TN. In addition to hiring 1,100 employees to meet the demands of market share growth and peak season, Gap partnered with AHS to implement an automated order fulfillment system.

In September 2022, the company announced it would end its partnership with Kanye West. Several days later, Gap announced it would cut some 500 corporate positions in its San Francisco and New York offices. The firm also cut corporate jobs in Asia. Gap announced that the layoffs were unrelated to the decision to end its partnership with West.

Gap Inc. has decided to completely leave Russia, as well as close all stores in the country, due to the unpopularity of the brand in Russia.

Corporate identity

Logo
Gap Inc. owns a trademark to its name, "Gap". The Gap's original trademark was a service mark for retail clothing store services. The application was filed with the United States Patent and Trademark Office on February 29, 1972, by The Gap Stores; registration was granted on October 10, 1972. The first use of the trademark was on August 23, 1969, and expanded to commercial usage on October 17, 1969. A second application was filed by Gap Stores, Inc. on September 12, 1970, this time for a trademark filed for shirts. The first usage for shirts and clothing products was on June 25, 1974. Trademark registration was granted on December 28, 1976. Both the service mark and trademark are registered and owned by Gap (Apparel), LLC of San Francisco, California.

On October 4, 2010, in an effort to establish a contemporary presence, Gap introduced a new logo. It was designed with the Helvetica font and reduced the prominence of the brand's iconic blue box. After much public outcry, the company reverted to its previous "blue box" logo on October 11, after less than a week in use. Marka Hansen, the executive who oversaw the logo change, resigned February 1, 2011.

Brands

Banana Republic 
Banana Republic, a small safari-themed clothing retailer, was purchased by Gap in 1983 and was rebranded as an upscale clothing retailer in the late 1980s.

Old Navy 
Old Navy was launched in 1994 as a value chain. On February 28, 2019, Gap Inc., announced that Old Navy will spin-off from the company, making Old Navy independent from Gap Inc. This was reversed on January 16, 2020, when Gap Inc. announced that the separation had been called off.

Athleta 
Athleta was originally founded in 1998 as an independent company focused on women's athletic apparel. Gap acquired Athleta in 2008. Gap opened the first brick and mortar Athleta store in 2011.

Forth & Towne 
Forth & Towne, the company's fourth traditional retail concept, was launched on August 24, 2005, featuring apparel targeted toward women 35 years and older. On February 26, 2007, after an 18-month trial period, it was discontinued. 
The Gap originally targeted the younger generation when it opened, with its name referring to the generation gap of the time. It originally sold everything that Levi Strauss & Co made in every style, size, and color, and organized the stock by size. The Gap was the first of many shops that carried only Levi's. In 1973, Gap started making their own jeans as a way to differentiate themselves from department stores. Gap's current marketing works to appeal to a broad demographic of customers, whereas Banana Republic presents a sophisticated image with a self expressing easygoing personality and Old Navy focuses "fun, fashion, and value" for families and younger customers. While the company has been criticized for blandness and uniformity in its selling environments, it maintains that it tailors its stores "to appeal to unique markets" by developing multiple formats and designs. The domain www.gap.com attracts over 18 million visitors annually, according to a 2008 Compete.com survey.  The brand is being criticized in the UK because the merchandise that is offered to the UK customers cost double the prices (or even a direct $/£ swap) found in the United States. Gap also does not offer XXL or larger sizes in the UK stating the UK market does not require them in contrast to market leader NEXT who offer a variety of larger sizes in the UK. In 2018, a Gap ad campaign featuring a young girl wearing a hijab has been stirring up controversy in France.

International presence

Including both company-owned and franchised stores, as of June 2018, there were Gap, Banana Republic, Athleta, Intermix, or Old Navy stores in 43 countries. In January 2008, Gap signed a deal with Marinopoulos Group to open Gap and Banana Republic stores in Greece, Romania, Bulgaria, Cyprus, and Croatia. In February 2009, Elbit Imaging, Ltd. secured a franchise to open and operate Gap and Banana Republic stores in Israel. In August 2010, the company opened its first store in Melbourne, Australia at Chadstone Shopping Centre. In September 2011, Komax opened the first Gap store in Chile, due to a franchise. In October 2011, the first GAP store opened in Warsaw, Poland, but shut it down and two other locations in Wrocław and Katowice in 2015. Gap now has a store in New Delhi, India which opened in May 2015. On February 20, 2016, Gap launched stores in Mumbai at Oberoi Mall and Infinity-2.

In May 2016, Gap Inc. announced it would shutter all Old Navy stores in Japan in response to poor Q1 performance for Old Navy and consistent losses across the organization.

In 2017, Gap closed all seven of its stores in Israel. In 2018, Gap closed all its stores in Australia.

By May 2021, Gap operated company-owned stores in the United States, Canada, Mexico, the United Kingdom, France, India, Italy, the Czech Republic, Ireland, Japan, Philippines, China, and Taiwan .

However, in June 2021, Gap confirmed plans to close all its 81 stores in the UK and Ireland and go online-only. The company said it would close all its stores "in a phased manner" between the end of August and the end of September. At the same time, Gap said it was in negotiations with another firm to take over all of its French stores. In Italy, Gap said it was in discussions with a partner for the potential acquisition of the stores there. In September 2021, Gap and British clothes retailer Next announced a joint venture that will see Next manage Gap's UK website and place Gap concessions in some stores. The deal preserves Gap's presence on the UK high street following the closure of its own stores. In November 2022, Baozun announced it intended to purchase Gaps's China unit, and that it would continue to operate Gap stores in China and Taiwan as franchises.

Product Red

In 2006, Gap took part in the Product Red campaign with the launch of a special RED collection, including a T-shirt manufactured in Lesotho from African cotton. The expanded Gap Product Red collection was released on October 13, 2006. 50 to 100 percent of the profits went to the Global Fund, depending on the item. The company continued the products into 2007, especially in the lead up to Valentine's Day, using slogans such as "Admi(RED)" and "Desi(RED)". National Labor Committee for Worker and Human Rights activists criticized Gap's partnerships because Gap has historically been accused of sweatshop-like conditions. Product Red has contributed over $45 million to the Global Fund, more than any other private donation received to date. Other launch partners included American Express, Apple Inc., Converse, Hallmark, Emporio Armani, and Motorola.

Controversies
Reports from news outlets of sweatshop workers in Saipan not being paid for overtime work, being subjected to forced abortion, and being required to work in unsafe working conditions surfaced in 1999. In 2003, a class action lawsuit against Gap and 21 other companies was started which ended when a settlement of 20 million dollars was reached.

In May 2006, adult and child employees of Western Factory, a supplier in Irbid, Jordan, were found to have worked up to 109 hours per week and to have gone six months without being paid. Some employees claimed they had been raped by managers. The government of Jordan launched an investigation into the supplier and other textile factories and announced actions to prevent future abuses. Walmart, who also sources from the supplier, confirmed "serious problems with working conditions" at Western Factory and other Jordanian suppliers. , Gap had ceased their relationship with Western Factory.

On October 28, 2007, BBC footage showed child labor in Indian Gap factories. The company denied knowledge of the happenings; it subsequently removed and destroyed the single piece of clothing in question, a smock blouse, from a British store. Gap promised to investigate breaches in its ethical policy.

On February 19, 2014, Glenn Murphy, CEO of Gap Inc., announced Gap will raise the minimum wages for its 65,000 U.S. store employees.

In 2020, the Australian Strategic Policy Institute accused at least 82 major brands, including Gap Inc, of being connected to forced Uyghur labor in Xinjiang.

In 2020, a partnership between Gap and the rapper Kanye West was announced as a part of a 10-year deal. However, West accused Gap of failing to honor terms of the deal and decided to end the partnership in September 2022.

Carbon footprint
Gap reported Total CO2e emissions (Direct + Indirect) for the twelve months ending 31 December 2020 at 241 Kt (-123 /-33.8% y-o-y) and plans to reduce total emissions 90% by 2030 from a 2017 base year. This science-based target is aligned with Paris Agreement to limit global warming to 1.5 °C above pre-industrial levels.

Management

Leadership
The current leadership is:
 Bob Martin, Interim President and CEO, Gap Inc.
 Teri List-Stoll, EVP and CFO
 Neil Fiske, President & CEO, Gap
 Mark Breitbard, President & CEO, Banana Republic
 Nancy Green, President and CEO, Athleta
 Jyothi Rao, President and General Manager, Intermix
 Michael Yee, EVP and General Manager, Greater China
 Julie Gruber, EVP, General Counsel, Corporate Secretary, Chief Compliance Officer, Gap Inc.
 Michele Nyrop, EVP, Chief People Officer, Gap Inc.
 Sebastian DiGrande, EVP, Strategy & Chief Customer Officer, Gap Inc.
 Christophe Roussel, EVP Global Sourcing, Gap Inc.
 Sally Gilligan, Chief Information Officer
 Shawn Curran, EVP, Global Supply Chain and Product Operations, Gap Inc.

Board of directors
Board :
 Robert J. Fisher
 William S. Fisher
 Tracy Gardner
 Bob L. Martin (Chair)
 Chris O'Neill
 Mayo A. Shattuck III
 Kathryn A. Hall
 Amy Miles
 Salaam Coleman Smith

Stores

As of the end of Q3 2018, Gap Inc. had 3,688 company-operated or franchised stores in operation across 43 countries and had the ability to ship to 90 countries. Stores in Brazil, Canada, China, France, Italy, Ireland, Japan, Mexico, UK, and US (including Puerto Rico) are company-owned; those outside of these countries are owned and operated by franchises.

In addition to previous store closures (such as the 2011-2013 closures in the U.S.), hundreds of stores were closed worldwide over several years, starting in 2020. (See  section for details.) Being mostly based on 2018 data, the table below is largely out-of-date.

See also 

 Bonds (clothing)
 H&M
 Forever 21
 Calvin Klein
 Hollister Co.

References

External links

 

 Daily Telegraph: Don Fisher obituary
  Gap sorry for selling T-shirt with 'incorrect' map of China

 
01
Clothing brands of the United States
Children's clothing brands
Children's clothing retailers
Fashion accessory brands
Jeans by brand
Online clothing retailers of the United States
Underwear brands
Multinational companies headquartered in the United States
Retail companies based in California
Companies based in San Francisco
Financial District, San Francisco
American companies established in 1969
Clothing companies established in 1969
Retail companies established in 1969
1969 establishments in California
Companies listed on the New York Stock Exchange
1970s fashion
1980s fashion
1990s fashion
2000s fashion
2010s fashion
Australian companies disestablished in 2018
2018 disestablishments in Israel
Family-owned companies of the United States